The Prince Philip Medal is named after Prince Philip, Duke of Edinburgh, who was the Senior Fellow of the Royal Academy of Engineering (RAE).  In 1989 Prince Philip agreed to the commissioning of solid gold medals to be "awarded periodically to an engineer of any nationality who has made an exceptional contribution to engineering as a whole through practice, management or education."  The first of these medals was awarded in 1991 to Air Commodore Sir Frank Whittle.

Background
The Prince Philip medal is awarded through the Royal Academy of Engineering. Nominations are opened around September each year.
Candidates can be from any nationality and hence it is an international award. Although it is an annual award, at times when 
there is no qualified candidate, the medal is not awarded. Winners include people from industry and university.

Winners

Previous recipients of the Prince Philip medal were:

Others
Another different medal also known as the Prince Philip medal is the City and Guilds Institute of London Gold Medal, awarded by the City & Guilds.

See also

 List of engineering awards

Notes

International awards
Awards established in 1991
Awards of the Royal Academy of Engineering
1991 establishments in the United Kingdom
Medal